The Turismo Carretera version of the Ford Falcon is a stock car, based on the Ford Falcon, designed, developed, and produced since 1965.

References

Cars of Argentina
Turismo Carretera